Tessah Andrianjafitrimo (born 11 October 1998) is a French professional tennis player of Malagasy descent. She was born in Montpellier, France.

On 20 June 2022, she achieved her best WTA singles ranking of 139. Andrianjafitrimo has won six singles and two doubles titles on the ITF Circuit.

Personal life
Her father, Teddy Andrianjafitrimo, was born in Madagascar. Teddy was an excellent amateur tennis player. A tennis champion of Madagascar and Africa, he did not become a professional tennis player because of lacking financial support to do so. Teddy immigrated to France and worked as a club coach; he is currently Tessah's coach. Tessah was born in Montpellier and has been living in Nogaro since 2010. She has two younger siblings.

Career

Junior
Andrianjafitrimo started playing tennis when she was five years old. She was the 2014 national girls' champion of France in the 15–16 year-olds category. She had a career-high ITF junior combined ranking of world No. 29, attained on 14 September 2015.

2013–2014
Andrianjafitrimo made her ITF Women's Circuit debut in September 2013 at the $25k indoor hardcourt tournament held in Clermont-Ferrand, France; she only entered that tournament's singles event, losing in the first qualifying round. She played a total of seven ITF Circuit tournaments in 2013 and 2014.

2015–2016
Andrianjafitrimo made her Grand Slam singles debut thanks to a wildcard at the 2015 French Open qualifying, where she defeated Patricia Mayr-Achleitner in the first round before losing to Olivia Rogowska.

She also made her WTA Tour singles main-draw debut at the Luxembourg Open thanks to a wildcard, losing her first-round match to Tatjana Maria. Three weeks later, Andrianjafitrimo made her WTA 125 singles debut at the Open de Limoges; she entered the singles main draw as a wildcard and lost her first-round match to Carina Witthöft.

Andrianjafitrimo received a wildcard for the singles main draw of the 2016 French Open (that was her Grand Slam singles main-draw debut), where she lost 0–6, 0–6 to the unseeded Wang Qiang. She also played in the girls' singles main draw of the French Open, where she was defeated in the second round by Lucrezia Stefanini.

2019
At the French Open, Andrianjafitrimo failed to convert two match points in the third set of the singles qualifying first-round match against Rebecca Marino, who won the match 6–7, 6–4, 7–5.

Grand Slam performance timeline

Singles

Doubles

ITF Circuit finals

Singles: 12 (6 titles, 6 runner–ups)

Doubles: 3 (2 titles, 1 runner–up)

References

External links
 
 

1998 births
Living people
French female tennis players
Sportspeople from Montpellier
Sportspeople from Gers
French sportspeople of Malagasy descent
Black French sportspeople